Stanisław Ruziewicz (29 August 1889 – 12 July 1941) was a Polish mathematician and one of the founders of the Lwów School of Mathematics.

He was a former student of Wacław Sierpiński, earning his doctorate in 1913 from the University of Lwów; his thesis concerned continuous functions that are not differentiable. He became a professor at the same university (then named Jan Kazimierz University) and rector of the Academy of Foreign Trade in Lwów. During the Second World War, Ruziewicz's home city of Lwów was annexed by the 
Ukrainian Soviet Socialist Republic, but then taken over by the General Government of German-occupied Poland in July 1941; Ruziewicz was arrested and murdered by the Gestapo on 12 July 1941 in Lwów, during the Massacre of Lwów professors.

The Ruziewicz problem, asking whether the Lebesgue measure on the sphere may be characterized by certain of its properties, is named after him.

References

1889 births
1941 deaths
Lwów School of Mathematics
Victims of the Massacre of Lwów professors
People from the Kingdom of Galicia and Lodomeria
People from Kolomyia
Polish people executed by Nazi Germany